Giedrė Paugaitė  (born 15 July 1990  Mažeikiai ) is a Lithuanian basketball player.

She competed at the 2006 U16  European Championship, winning a bronze medal, and 2009  U19 World Championship. 2010 FIBA Europe Under-20 Championship for Women, EuroBasket Women 2015, 2015–16 EuroCup Women, and 2016–17 EuroCup Women.

She played for TTT Riga.

Club 

 2005–2006 :  Lintel 118 Vilnius
 2006–2009 :  Arvi Marijampolė
 2009–2010 :  TEO Vilnius
 2010–2011 :  VICI Aistes Kaunas
 2011–2013 :  USO Mondeville
 2013–2014 :  Flammes Carolo basket
 2014–2016 :  BC Tsmoki Minsk
 2016– :  TTT Riga

References 

1980 births
Lithuanian women's basketball players
Living people